Ernest Henry Bambridge (16 May 1848 – 16 October 1917) was an English footballer who made one appearance as a forward for England in 1876. He was the eldest of three brothers who played for England.

Career
His football career was spent with Windsor Home Park, Swifts, East Sheen and Corinthian and he gained representative honours for Berkshire. His solitary England appearance came on 4 March 1876 against Scotland at Hamilton Crescent, Partick. According to Philip Gibbons, "England struggled throughout the game, which saw the home team run out winners by three goals to nil."

His younger brothers, Arthur and Charles played 3 and 18 times respectively for England. They are the only trio of brothers to have played for England.

Bambridge earned his living as a member of the London Stock Exchange. He died in Southend on 16 October 1917.

References

External links

England profile
Family history
The Famous Bambridge Brothers - Article in Slough History online

1848 births
1917 deaths
Sportspeople from Windsor, Berkshire
English footballers
England international footballers
Swifts F.C. players
Corinthian F.C. players
Association football wing halves
Footballers from Berkshire